Aosta Valley Airport formerly Corrado Gex Airport  is an airport located in Saint-Christophe and serving Aosta, a city in the Aosta Valley region of Italy.

Air Vallée previously had its head office on the property of Aosta Airport. 
The largest aircraft that has operated at the airport was a BAe 146 operated by Malmo Aviation, but the Boeing 737 and Airbus A318 could possibly also land there too.

Airlines and destinations
As of August 2022, there are no scheduled services at the airport.

Statistics

See also
List of airports in Italy

References

External links
  Official site
 

Airports in Italy
Buildings and structures in Aosta
Transport in Aosta Valley